Zilim (Yeźem) is a river in Bashkortostan, Russia. It is a right tributary of the Belaya.

References 

Rivers of Bashkortostan